Locks Creek is a  stream in San Mateo County, California. It is the largest tributary of Frenchmans Creek, a larger stream.

References

See also
List of watercourses in the San Francisco Bay Area

Rivers of San Mateo County, California
Rivers of Northern California